Srednekolymsky District (Orto Xalıma uluuha) is an administrative and municipal district (raion, or ulus), one of the thirty-four in the Sakha Republic, Russia. It is located in the north of the republic and borders with Verkhnekolymsky District in the south, Abyysky District in the west, Allaikhovsky District in the northwest, Nizhnekolymsky District in the north, Bilibinsky District of Chukotka Autonomous Okrug in the east, and with Srednekansky District of Magadan Oblast in the southeast. Its administrative center is the town of Srednekolymsk. Population:  8,353 (2002 Census);  The population of Srednekolymsk accounts for 44.6% of the district's total population.

Geography
The landscape of the district is mostly flat. The main rivers in the district include the Kolyma, the Alazeya and the Rossokha with the Arga-Yuryakh. There are many lakes, the largest of which are Lakes Pavylon and Balyma. Mount Chubukulakh is located in the district.

Climate

History 
The district was established on May 25, 1930.

Demographics 
From 1989 to 2007, the population of the district declined by almost 16%. A bulk of population are Yakuts (about 81%); other ethnicities include Russians (12%), Evens (4%), and Evenks (3%).

Economy
The economy of the district is mostly based on grazing-based animal husbandry, including reindeer, horse and cattle industries. There are deposits of construction materials.

Inhabited localities

Divisional source:

*Administrative centers are shown in bold

References

Notes

Sources

Districts of the Sakha Republic
States and territories established in 1930